Robert Fegg (born 26 October 1978) is a German luger who competed from 1997 to 2001. He won a silver medal in the mixed team event at the 1999 FIL World Luge Championships in Königssee, Germany.
In 1997, he won the gold medal at the Junior World Luge Championship in Oberhof (Germany) in singles and team event.
In 1998, he won the gold medal at the Junior World Luge Championship in Sigulda (Latvia) in the team event and silver medal in singles event.

 until 2014, Fegg was a coach on the Canadian national luge team. In 2014, Fegg coached the Korean luge team until 2018. In 2018, Fegg began coaching the United States junior luge team, and in 2020 was promoted to head coach of the United States senior luge team.

References
December 2006 newsletter on Canadian national luge team featuring Fegg as an assistant coach. - Accessed July 7, 2007.
FIL-Luge profile: Fegg, Robert
Hickok sports information on World champions in luge and skeleton.

External links
 

1978 births
Living people
German male lugers